Ambalada Peak is a rock peak,  high, standing  southeast of Griffin Nunatak in the Prince Albert Mountains of Victoria Land, Antarctica. It was mapped by the United States Geological Survey from surveys and U.S. Navy air photos, 1956–62, and was named by the Advisory Committee on Antarctic Names for Cesar N. Ambalada, an electrician with the South Pole Station winter party, 1966.

References 

Mountains of Victoria Land
Scott Coast